The 2004–05 season was Fussball Club Basel 1893's 112th in existence and the club's 11th consecutive season in the top flight of Swiss football. FC Basel started the season off with various warm-up matches. These included teams from the Swiss lower league as well as teams from Liechtenstein, France and Germany. The FC Basel aims for the 2004–05 season were to defend their league title, to win the cup and as well as to qualify for the UEFA Champions League group stage.

Overview
As reigning champions Basel were favourites to retain their title and as Swiss champions, they entered the UEFA Champions League in third qualifying round. Basel's biggest signing in advance of the 2004–05 season was Kléber from Hannover 96. But in the other direction the Cameroonian international Timothée Atouba and Swiss international Mario Cantaluppi left the club. During the winter break they signed Patrick Müller from Mallorca.

The Campaign

Domestic League
The Swiss Football Association (ASF-SFV) had changed the format of the domestic league the previous season and this format called Swiss Super League remains unaltered this season. There were ten teams competing in the top tier 2004–05 Swiss Super League. The teams played a double round-robin in the first half of the season and then another double round-robin in the second half. There were three points for a victory and one each for a draw. The champions and runners-up would enter the qualifying rounds of the [2005–06 Champions League, the third placed team would enter the UEFA Cup second qualifying round. The bottom placed team would be relegated, the second last team would play a play-off against relegation.

Basel's priority aim for the season was to win the championship for the second time in a row. The season started somewhat difficult, of the first four home matches only two were won. Nevertheless, Basel moved to the top of the league table. During September the team lost two away games in a row, but despite this they led the league table by seven points by the winter break.

The league was originally contested by ten teams. On 4 February 2005 the parent company of Servette FC was declared bankrupt. As a consequence of the bankruptcy Servette FC had their license revoked. The eighteen results from the team's first half of the season remained in the league table. The club's second half matches were cancelled entirely and so the second half of the season was competed with only nine clubs.

Basel completed all the season's seventeen home ties undefeated, winning thirteen and drawing four. The highest home attendance being 31,383 in the 4–1 win against their title rivals Thun on 7 May 2005. Just four days later Basel secured the championship in their third last round of the season. At the end of the season they completed their championship aim, winning the title ten points clear of Thun, who were their closest rivals. Servette were subsequently demoted to the Second Tier. Schaffhausen played the play-off against relegation and were able to remain in the top flight.

One of the season's highlights for the team, was the 8–1 home win on 12 September against Grasshoppers in which Giménez scored four goals. Matías Delgado, Mladen Petrić, Djamel Mesbah and César Carignano each netted once. On 20 April Giménez also scored for goals in the away game against Aarau as Basel won 5–0. He also managed at hat-trick on 4 May as Basel won 5–0 in the away game against Xamax. Giménez was the team's and the league's top goal scorer with 27 goals. Matías Delgado was the team's second top scorer with 11 league goals. César Carignano scored seven and Julio Hernán Rossi scored six.

Domestic Cup
Basel entered the Swiss Cup in the first round and the team's clear aim for the Cup was to win it. Teams from Super League and Challenge League were seeded in this round. In a match, the home advantage was granted to the team from the lower league, if applicable. 

FC Oberdorf (18 September 2004)
In the first round Basel were drawn against local amateur club FC Oberdorf, who at that time played in the fifth tier of Swiss football. The grounds that Oberdorf used at that time was an artificial turf field and on one side was a small grandstand with 100 covered seats and space for maximum 2,000 spectators. Because of the big fixture in the Cup temporary stands were built and the match was played in front of over 5,000 spectators. Head-coach Christian Gross left seven regular players out of the team and played with a B-team. Nevertheless, they took command of the game from the first whistle and Julio Hernán Rossi netted their first goal after three minutes. Rossi's next shot ten minutes later rebounded off the post and another ten minutes later he scored his second goal. Rossi remained lively and his next shot also hit the post. Basel let the amateurs play their game but after about an hour it was obvious that their strength decreased. Mile Sterjovski added a third goal on 70 minutes, Boris Smiljanić hit the post with a header and David Degen added another goal and the result was 4–0 for the visitors.

FC Meyrin (24 October 2004)
In the second round the teams from Super League were seeded and could not play against each other. In a match, the home advantage was granted to the team from the lower league. Basel were drawn against second tier semi-professional team FC Meyrin. Their stadium Bois-Carré (Meyrin) was also small and so they also built temporary stands and the game was played in front of a record 3,148 spectators. Basel took command of the game from the first minutes and Julio Hernán Rossi was again in good form and his sprints into the free spaces were very quick. It was he who netted Basel's first goal after 15 minutes. Basel remained in control of the game, but it was the hosts who scored the equaliser after a counterattack just before the half time whistle. Basel tool control of the game again but the lower-tier team defended with everything they had. Christian Giménez was substituted in the 69th minute and just a seconds later he put the visitors into the lead again. Seven minutes later Giménez netted his second personal goal and the result was 3–1 for Basel.

FC Thun (20 November 2004)
In the third round the ties were drawn, there was no seeding, everyone could meet everyone. The home advantage was granted to the team from the lower league, otherwise to the team that was drawn first. Basel were drawn away against Super League team Thun. Basel head-coach Christian Gross fielded his strongest team, however four players were injured and Benjamin Huggel was missing due to a suspension. The game between the two teams was at eye level, both teams created their chances. Mario Raimondi was able to put the hosts a goal up in the 57th minute, but the lively Julio Hernán Rossi equalised ten minutes later. The match went into extra time but no further goals were scored and a penalty shoot-out was held to make the decision. In the shoot-out Boris Smiljanić missed Basel's second penalty, then Mario Raimondi missed Thun's third and as Mile Sterjovski missed Basel's last spot-kick it was clear that Basel lost 4–3 on penalties.

Conclusion
Thus Basel missed their aim of winning the Cup. The Cup final was played on 16 May 2005 in which upper tier Zürich beat lower tier Luzern 3–1 to win the trophy.

Europe

Champions League

Third qualifying round
Because Basel entered the 2004–05 UEFA Champions League in the third qualifying round their aim was to reach the group stage. However, they were drawn against Internazionale.

Internazionale (11 August 2004)
The first leg was played in St. Jakob-Park and was arbitrated by English referee Graham Poll. Pushed on by the sold-out 30,000 spectator crowd the Swiss champions Basel took the early initiative and it was their Argentinian attacking duo Christian Giménez and Julio Hernán Rossi dictating the flow of the game from the very beginning. Inter defended well in the early stage and after they had withstood the early storm, they started to get their game together, stringing their passes together and it was the away side who made the first strike. In the 19th minute, Adriano powered past two Basel defenders and placed his shot low beyond the onrushing goalkeeper Pascal Zuberbühler. Basel were not shocked by this early strike against them, and countered this just six minutes later. Mario Cantaluppi surprised the Inter defence by lobbing a free-kick high to the near post, here it was controlled by Rossi who then, with a smart overhead kick, played it into the danger area. Benjamin Huggel was ready and headed in from close range. Inter reacted immediately, but Dejan Stanković's powerful long-range shot rebounded off the post. Then the game opened and Basel could have scored again as Huggel's right-footed volley from about 12 yards narrowly flashed wide. However, it was Inter who had the best opportunity before the break. Again, it was Adriano rushing towards goal, Zuberbühler rushed out against him but could only parry the ball straight into the path of Zé Maria, but his shot from close range hit the bar. Basel started into the second period as they had started in the first, pushing forwards with tempo. Francesco Toldo made to good saves, first parrying a long-range lob from Matías Delgado and then a hard hit shot from Rossi. The Italian championship had not yet started and the Swiss season had already been going for a month, therefore the Inter players were tired towards the end, however Basel failed to take advantage of this, Huggel coming closest in the 78th minute as he hit a low drive from the edge of the penalty area, but the visitors were saved by the post. The game ended with a 1–1 draw.

Return match (25 August 2004)
In the second leg it was Inter who were quickly into play, with Álvaro Recoba forcing Basel goalkeeper Pascal Zuberbühler into a good save a few seconds after kick-off. Only a few seconds later the home crowd were able to celebrate as Adriano put Inter ahead with a low shot precise inside the far post after a pass from Dejan Stanković. Inter controlled the game in the early stages and scored their second goal after just 13 minutes. A superb shot from Stankovic, following a neat combination with Adriano gave the home team a two-goal advantage. Despite the two-goal lead, the home side refused to sit back and Zuberbühler had to make another good save after a long distance left-foot shot by Recoba. After 26 minutes, Inter goalie Francesco Toldo deflected a powerful free-kick from Basel captain Murat Yakin wide. Inter went close to scoring a third goal just minutes later as Stankovic shot wide from a good position after a combination between Zé Maria and Adriano on the right wing. Basel had another dangerous free-kick shortly before half-time, Mario Cantaluppi's kick was slightly wide. Basel fought themselves back into the game. Just four minutes into the second half as Austrainlien midfielder Mile Sterjovski, just inside the penalty area, controlled a cross from his left to dribble past Stankovic and score with an exact right-foot shot. However, the home team restored their two-goal lead only four minutes later as Adriano took on a ball from Stankovic outside the penalty area. He took a few paces forward and fired low, left footed, beyond keeper Zuberbühler. The home team secured their victory a few minutes later, this time Recoba's left footed shot dropped into the net. The Uruguayan forward controlled a long pass from Juan Sebastián Verón, he turned towards the Basel goal and shot from about 18 metres and the game ended for Basel with an undeserved high 1–4 defeat.
 
Basel lost 5–2 on aggregate and subsequently dropped into the 2004–05 UEFA Cup.

UEFA Cup

First round
Basel's clear aim for this competition was to reach the group stage and to advance to the knock-out stage, which was to start after the winter break. In the first round Basel were drawn against the Russian side FC Terek Grozny.

Terek Grozny (16 September 2004)
The first leg of the tie against the Russian Cup holders was played in the Lokomotiv Stadium (Moscow) because of the political situation in Chechnya. Torrential rain before and during the game had made pitch soggy and tricky underfoot. In the early minutes the home defence had problems keeping the Basel forwards under control. The visitors started well and looked the most likely team to score in the early stages. After just four minutes Christian Giménez was unlucky not to score, his close-range header hit the post after Mile Sterjovski had nodded forward a right-wing cross from Julio Hernán Rossi. In the ninth minute Giménez again went close, but his header was held by Terek goalkeeper Volodymyr Savchenko at the second attempt. The home side came better into the game as the match progressed. With their only real chance of the first half they took the lead as a through-ball from Aleksandr Shmarko beat the Basel offside trap and Andrei Fedkov pushed the ball past keeper Pascal Zuberbühler in the 38th minute. Basel pressed consistently for an equaliser. Scott Chipperfield's corner from the left in the 57th minute was headed on by Rossi and Giménez was left unmarked to score with his knee from just three metres. Despite the fact that towards the end of the game it was the home team who more in control of the game and despite the slippy conditions, the two defences remained mainly on top and the game ended with this 1–1 draw.

Return match (30 September 2004)
The second leg was played in St. Jakob-Park in front of 15,895 spectators. It was again Basel who started better into the game. Christian Giménez was again the most dangerous striker with two early chances. But it was Julio Hernán Rossi who opened the score in the 11th minute. Basel should have added to the score with the chances that they created, but as the match progressed the Terek midfield and defense became more hardy and Basel were lacking creative ideas, especially in the second period. In the 65th minute, therefore, Basel head-coach Christian Gross substituted Rossi out and brought in the more creative player Matías Delgado. This tactical move paid-off as in the 89th minute Delgado crossed from the left after a corner-kick and Brasilian right back Kléber nodded the ball home to give Basel a 2–0 win and a 3–1 on aggregate.

Group stage
In the group stage Basel faced considerably tougher opponents. Five teams were drawn into each of the eight groups and were to play a round robin, there were no return games. The top three teams in each group progressed to the Round of 32, to be joined by the eight third-place finishers from the Champions League group stage. Basel were drawn in to Group A together with Feyenoord Rotterdam, FC Schalke 04, Ferencvárosi TC and Heart of Midlothian. 

Schalke 04 (21 October 2004)
On matchday one Basel played in the Arena AufSchalke in front of an attendance of 52,870 spectators in Gelsenkirchen against German team Schalke 04, who had won the Intertoto Cup in August. Basel captain Murat Yakin could not play due to back injuries and midfielder Ivan Ergic was also ruled out due to an injury. The Swiss Super League leaders started fast and confident into the game, pushing Schalke back with early attacks. But then the German side took control of the match. Midfielder Christian Poulsen won a loose ball and played a long ball to winger Levan Kobiashvili, who broke through the middle and shot powerfully passed Basel keeper Pascal Zuberbühler from outside the penalty after eight minutes. Schalke striker Gerald Asamoah was very lively and the visitors were forced to defend deep. Basel eventually fought back to claim the midfield with some quick and accurate passes and they created their best chance in the 36th minute. Julio Hernán Rossi's corner-kick from the left was met well by Benjamin Huggel who headed toward goal from close range, but keeper Frank Rost was able to push the ball away to safety. Following a poor start to the second half, Basel came back to life. First David Degen with a good break forced an excellent save from Rost, then after 57 minutes Christian Giménez' headed forced the goalkeeper to tip the ball over the bar, at full stretch. In the 82nd minute an impressive free-kick from substitute Matías Delgado, who curled his shot over the wall and left keeper Rost stranded at the wrong side of the goal. The 1–1 draw was the result.

Heart of Midlothian (25 November 2004)
On matchday two (4 November) Basel had their rest-day and on matchday three they played at home in St. Jakob-Park in front of 21,650 spectators, with Kristinn Jakobsson (Iceland) as referee, against Hearts. Basel captain Murat Yakin could not play due to his sustaining back injuries, striker Mladen Petrić was out injured and midfielder Ivan Ergic was also ruled out ill. Hearts had lost their first two games in the group. Basel started well into the game and their striker Christian Giménez slashed a hard shot towards the far corner of the goal in the opening minutes, which needed a good save from keeper Craig Gordon. The young goalkeeper blocked the shot into the field, but Julio Hernán Rossi was not able to reach the rebound. Basel dominated the game, they restricted the visitors immensely and Hearts were only able to entered the Basel penalty area from set-pieces. Following a free-kick and a near miss from Michael Stewart, just minutes later Hearts took a surprise lead. A set-piece and Hearts surprisingly played the ball low, three quick passes, Dennis Wyness found room and the striker slotted the ball beyond goalkeeper Pascal Zuberbühler for the first goal of the game. The home team were now forced to be more committed with their attacks and they put Hearts under increased pressure, responding well to the conceded goal. Only some desperate last-ditch defending denied the hosts from obtaining their equaliser. Basel then started the second half as they had ended the first period, pressing forward. Basel's head-coach Christian Gross changed his attackers midway through the second half and his substitutions quickly paid out. César Carignano slotted home the equaliser. Basel pressed hard for the winning goal as the time ticked on. Hearts' last-gasp winner, in the 89th minute, was more a speculative attack and was made only to relieve the defensive pressure, but it paid off as Robbie Neilson pushed his shot under the body of goalie Zuberbühler with only seconds left on the clock, his first ever goal for the club. Basel versus Hearts 1–2 result.

Ferencvárosi TC (1 December 2004)
Matchday four saw Basel play the away tie at the Stadium Puskás Ferenc with some 22,000 spectators against Ferencvárosi TC under referee Vitaliy Godulyan (Ukraine). Basel started, as ever, fast and dominant into the game, and because head-coach Christian Gross had lined up a three-man attack, this formation led to a number of early chances. In the 8th minute Julio Hernán Rossi fed Christian Giménez with a good pass, he crossed from the left, but striker César Carignano was unable to put the visitors ahead. Basel also had a height advantage at set-pieces and one minute later, Marco Zwyssig rose highest to head Sébastien Barberis' free-kick, but the effort went narrowly wide. On 19 minutes Boris Smiljanić also headed an effort just wide of Lajos Szűcs' left-hand post. Despite their early domination, Basel went behind three minutes later, Smiljanic fouled Aleksandar Bajevski in the box. Szabolcs Huszti's spot-kick was parried by Pascal Zuberbühler, but the keeper was unable to keep hold of the ball. Huszti reacted first, he headed the rebound across the goal and Dénes Rósa was able to head the ball into the net. Basel dominated the second half as well and goals from Rossi and Benjamin Huggel turned the match in Basel's favour. However, the Hungarian side failed to level things in the 86th minute with their second penalty, as keeper Szücs shot the ball wide. Basel beat Ferencváros 2–1 and moved up to third slot in the table. 

Feyenoord Rotterdam (16 December 2004)
The fifth and final matchday of the group stage was played at home in St. Jakob-Park in front of 25,660 spectators against Feyenoord. Again the early stages of the game were dominated by Basel, with Christian Giménez being extremely lively at the outset. In the third minute he rushed down the right wing to bring in a dangerous cross that flashed across the goal area. Then he switched over to the other wing four minutes later and combined with Julio Hernán Rossi, who in turn crossed to Mile Sterjovski and his header found the target, but was disallowed due to an offside position. Minutes later Giménez was again involved, speedily moving into space in the box, in a strong counterattack. He unleashed a fierce shot, but Patrick Mtiliga was able to stretch and block the ball. In the 18th minute a second disallowed goal, Giménez poking the ball in from close range but he was denied by the assistant's flag. Feyenoord threatened for the first time in the 25th minute, Salomon Kalou used his strength to overcome defensive-midfielder Benjamin Huggel, but hise his effort went wide. Feyenoord played better in the final stages of the first half, with good passes in midfield and some direct balls into the penalty area. However, Basel defended well and they still created the better chances, Rossi forced a good save from keeper Patrick Lodewijks, Scott Chipperfield headed a cross just wide of the post and Giménez tested the goalkeeper again with a powerful left-footed drive.

Basel came into the second half aiming to dominate possession and initially they did so. But Feyenoord showed their counterattacking potential with a long ball and Salomon Kalou's accurate shot, but home keeper Pascal Zuberbühler dived low to his left and pushed the ball around the post. After this, Giménez received a good pass from Carignano, but smashed his half-volley straight at keeper Lodewijks. In the 53rd minute these two strikers combined again for the game's decisive moment. Giménez lifted his cross over the defence, Carignano sprinted in at the far post and headed the all-important winning goal. Thereafter Basel concentrated on containing their opponents to protected their safe passage into the next round. This was successful and the final result was this one goal victory. The goal difference decided the positions in the table, because Feyenoord, Schalke and Basel finished level on seven points. But Basel qualified for the Round of 32.

Round of 32

The final phase of the 2004–05 UEFA Cup began on 16 February 2005, and concluded with the final at the Estádio José Alvalade in Lisbon on 18 May 2005. The final phase involved the 24 teams that finished in the top three in each group in the group stage and the eight teams that finished in third place in the UEFA Champions League group stage. As third placed team in their group, Basel were qualified for the Round of 32 and here they were drawn against Lille OSC. 

Lille OSC (17 February 2005)
The first leg was played in the St. Jakob-Park in front of 19,092 spectators. French team Lille earned themselves a valuable away draw in the snow that fell in Basel during the match, as a frustrating evening for the hosts ended with a goalless draw and this thanks to the heroic game of Lille's Senegalese goalkeeper Tony Sylva. The Swiss champions Basel, who returned for the first time to competitive football following their two-month domestic winter break, played strongly in the opening period, but they had nothing to show despite their early efforts. This was also because of the snow and soggy pitch, that slowed their game, to the advantage of the visitors and their goalkeeper. In the first few minutes, a few near misses brought the match to life and these could have provided at least a goal or two. Basel created two excellent chances in quick succession, Christian Giménez headed a ball towards goalie Sylva from close-range, the goalie held. Then Julio Hernán Rossi failed to score following a defensive mix-up, the goalie held. Lille responded and full-back Grégory Tafforeau hit a strong drive from the distance, but the ball flew passed the wrong side of the far post. Basel pressed forward in the second half as well, but keeper Sylva was in unbeatable form in the Lille goal. Basel became even stronger as the match progressed, Christian Gross' men definitely controlled the game in the second half, but they were denied on several occasions by Sylva. The 29-year-old Senegalese international frustrated the home side on numerous occasions and therefore the game ended with a goalless draw.

Return match (24 February 2005)
The second leg was played a week later in Stadium Lille Métropole, which was the temporary home stadium of Lille OSC before the completion of the nearby Stade Pierre-Mauroy. Basel had played only one game after the winter break in the Swiss domestic league and they had lost this 3–1 against St. Gallen four days before this tie, but they started the game well. Lille had ended each of their last five games with a draw, three of these goalless and they looked nervous in the opening stages. However, goalkeeper Tony Sylva was rarely troubled. After somewhat more than half an hour Lille started to dominate possession, but lacked the finishing touch to show for some enterprising attacking play. Matt Moussilou in the 37th minute and a foul penalty converted by Milenko Ačimovič gave a comfortable 2–0 victory for the 2004 UEFA Intertoto Cup winners and let them advance to the next round and to set up an all-French tie with Auxerre in the Round of 16.

Conclusion
Basel were defeated 2–0 on aggregate by Lille OSC. The club had hoped that they could have continued a round or perhaps two further, but despite being knocked out at this stage, the aim for their European campaign could be considered as achieved. CSKA Moscow won the 2004–05 UEFA Cup beating Sporting CP in the final.

Club

The Management

Kit

|
|

Other information

Players

First team squad

Transfers Summer 2004

In

Out

Transfers Winter 2004–05

In

Out

Results and fixtures

Friendlies

Pre-season/First Half Season friendlies

Sempione Cup
The Sempione Cup was a club football tournament played in summer at Sportanlage Moos, Balsthal, during the years 1987 to 2004.

Uhrencup
The Uhrencup is a club football tournament, held annually in Grenchen.

Winter break and mid-season friendlies

Swiss Super League

First half of season
The Swiss Super League season was originally contested by ten teams.

Second half of season
On 4 February 2005 the parent company of Servette FC was declared bankrupt. It had run debts of over 10 million Swiss francs, having not paid the players since the previous November, and consequently the club suffered an exodus of players looking for paying clubs. As a consequence of the bankruptcy Servette FC had their license revoked, the club's second half matches were entirely cancelled. The second half of the season was therefore competed with only nine clubs. These each played another double round-robin schedule. Each of the nine clubs had played 34 matches at the end of the season.

Final league table

Swiss Cup

2004–05 Swiss Cup

UEFA Champions League
For more information, see 2004–05 UEFA Champions League

Third qualifying round

F.C. Internazionale Milano won 5 – 2 on aggregate.

UEFA Cup

First round

Basel won 3 – 1 on aggregate.

Group stage / Group A

Round of 32

Lille OSC won 2 – 0 on aggregate.

See also
 History of FC Basel
 List of FC Basel players
 List of FC Basel seasons

References

Sources
 Rotblau: Jahrbuch Saison 2015/2016. Publisher: FC Basel Marketing AG. 
 Rotblau: Jahrbuch Saison 2017/2018. Publisher: FC Basel Marketing AG. 
 Die ersten 125 Jahre / 2018. Publisher: Josef Zindel im Friedrich Reinhardt Verlag, Basel. 
 Switzerland 2004–05 at RSSSF

External links
 FC Basel official site

FC Basel seasons
Basel
2004-05